Saragossa is a genus of moths of the family Noctuidae.

Species
 Saragossa bergi (Kuznezov, 1908)
 Saragossa demotica (Püngeler, 1902)
 Saragossa incerta (Staudinger, 1896)
 Saragossa porosa (Eversmann, 1854)
 Saragossa seeboldi Staudinger, 1900
 Saragossa siccanorum (Staudinger, 1870)
 Saragossa uralica Hacker & Fibiger, 2002

References
Natural History Museum Lepidoptera genus database
Saragossa at funet

Hadenini